Svetlana Anatolyevna Boyko (born 13 April 1972) is a Russian foil fencer.

Career 
Boyko won the gold medal in the foil team event at the 2006 World Fencing Championships after beating Italy in the final. She accomplished this with her team mates Aida Chanaeva, Julia Khakimova, and Ianna Rouzavina.

On 15 August 2008 Boiko, with teammates Aida Chanaeva, Victoria Nikichina and Evgenia Lamonova, beat the United States team 28 to 11, winning the gold medals of 2008 Olympic Games. This was her fourth consecutive olympic appearance, now as the captain of the national team. Boiko is known among teammates as Mama Sveta - for her experience; she actually has two daughters.

On the domestic arena, Boiko defends the colours of CSKA and is in fact a major in Russian armed forces (as at 16 August 2008).  After winning the 2008 event, Boiko announced her retirement.

Achievements 
 2006 World Fencing Championships, team foil

References 

1972 births
Living people
Russian female foil fencers
Fencers at the 1996 Summer Olympics
Fencers at the 2000 Summer Olympics
Fencers at the 2004 Summer Olympics
Fencers at the 2008 Summer Olympics
Olympic fencers of Russia
Olympic gold medalists for Russia
Sportspeople from Rostov-on-Don
Olympic medalists in fencing
Medalists at the 2008 Summer Olympics
Universiade medalists in fencing
Universiade bronze medalists for Russia
Medalists at the 1999 Summer Universiade
21st-century Russian women